"Make Me Wanna" is a song co-written and recorded by the American country music singer Thomas Rhett. It was released in August 2014 as the fifth single from his first album, It Goes Like This.  The song was written by Rhett, Bart Butler and Larry McCoy.

Content
The song is mid-tempo with "high-toned guitars and a slowly building chorus" and a "sensitive and sexy delivery" about a man expressing his feelings to his lover. Rhett describes the song as having a Bee Gees sound.

Critical reception
The song has mostly been met with a positive reception, mainly for its disco influences. Bob Paxman of Country Weekly rated the single "B+", comparing its sound to "the candy coated days of Air Supply and Andy Gibb". He thought that it was "sure to nestle easily with the female audience" and was "pleasant, if not exactly outstanding", and criticized the "references to tailgating and trucks". Writing for Taste of Country, Carrie Horton wrote, "But while the lyrics may sound a bit too much like what’s already out there, the melody makes up for it ten times over. The Bee Gees-inspired tune features staccato drum and piano undertones that echo famous disco hits like ‘Stayin' Alive,’ but with a perfect blend of twangy guitars to keep the song’s sound just true enough for any pure country fan." Liv Carter of Little Rebellion gave the song two thumbs down, criticizing the production and unoriginality of the lyric. She summarized her review by writing, "This is an uncreative lyric inexplicably paired with 1970s pop. Which means it will probably be a big hit."

Commercial performance
The song entered the Country Airplay chart at No. 51 for the chart dated August 16, 2014, and the Hot Country Songs at No. 48 on September 13, 2014. It entered the Hot 100 chart at No. 99 for the chart dated November 29, 2014.  It reached No. 1 on the Country Airplay chart on March 7, 2015, his third No. 1 from his debut album. It is also Thomas' first #1 hit that he co-wrote. It peaked at No. 2 on the Hot Country Songs and No. 43 on the Billboard Hot 100 for the charts dated February 28, 2015.

The song was certified Gold by the RIAA on February 18, 2015. It has sold 596,000 copies in the US as of April 2015.

Music video
The music video was directed by TK McKamy and premiered in October 2014.

Charts and certifications

Weekly charts

Year-end charts

Certifications

References

2014 singles
Thomas Rhett songs
Songs written by Bart Butler
Songs written by Thomas Rhett
Song recordings produced by Jay Joyce
Big Machine Records singles
2013 songs
Music videos directed by TK McKamy
Songs about alcohol